This article provides details of international football games played by the Malaysia national football team from 2020 to present.

Results

2020
2022 World Cup qualification and 2020 AFF Championship matches that was scheduled to be played on 2020 was postponed and rescheduled multiple times due to the COVID-19 pandemic in Asia. Finally, majority of the upcoming matches was decided to be postponed to 2021.

2021

2022

2023

Note
 1 : Non FIFA 'A' International match

Forthcoming fixtures
The following matches are scheduled:

2023

References

Football in Malaysia
Malaysia national football team results
2020s in Malaysian sport